Dennis MacKay (born 1942)  is a former Canadian politician, who represented the electoral district of Bulkley Valley-Stikine in the Legislative Assembly of British Columbia from 2001 to 2009.

MacKay moved into the riding in 1981. Before becoming an MLA, MacKay worked as a private investigator, a provincial coroner, and a security patrol agent. He served with the Royal Canadian Mounted Police (RCMP) for more than 30 years, including two years with the RCMP's Musical Ride.

Election results

References

External links
Dennis Mackay at the Legislative Assembly of British Columbia.

Living people
British Columbia Liberal Party MLAs
1942 births
21st-century Canadian politicians
Royal Canadian Mounted Police officers
Canadian coroners
Private detectives and investigators
Security guards